Ilija Bozoljac was the defending champion, but retired due to a right ankle injury in the second round, when he played with his compatriot Filip Krajinović.
Paolo Lorenzi defeated Grega Žemlja 1–6, 7–6(4), 6–2 in the final.

Seeds

Draw

Final four

Top half

Bottom half

References
 Main Draw
 Qualifying Draw

BMW Ljubljana Open - Singles
BMW Ljubljana Open